Iliriana Sulkuqi (born 1951) is an Albanian poet and journalist living in the United States.

She was born in Elbasan and studied at the Skanderbeg Military University. After completing her education, she served as an officer in the academy and as a journalist for the military press until 1995, reaching the rank of lieutenant-colonel. She later worked for Drita, a newspaper published by the Albanian Writers Union. Sulkuqi moved to New York City in 2004. She manages the publication of the literary magazine Pelegrin (Pilgrim).

She began to write while still young. Her work has appeared in various anthologies and been translated into English, Italian, Greek, Bulgarian, Romanian and Macedonian. She helped initiate and contributed to an anthology of writing by Albanian exiles entitled Perëndim i malluar (Waiting for the sunset). She is one of a number of Albanian poets who have written haiku in Albanian.

Sulkuqi is a member of the International Federation of Journalists and the Albanian-American Academy of Arts and Sciences.

Selected works 

 Po plas (I'm fed up) (2009)

Further reading

References 

1951 births
Living people
Albanian expatriates in the United States
20th-century Albanian poets
Albanian journalists
Albanian women journalists
People from Elbasan
Albanian women poets
21st-century Albanian poets
20th-century Albanian women writers
21st-century Albanian women writers